Johnny Murphy (born 1954 in Crossabeg, County Wexford) is an Irish retired sportsperson.  He played hurling with his local club Crossabeg-Ballymurn and was a member of the Wexford senior inter-county team in the 1970s and 1980s.

References

1954 births
Living people
Crossabeg Ballymurn hurlers
Wexford inter-county hurlers